The St. Mathias Cemetery, Wrought-Iron Cross Site is a historic site near Orrin, North Dakota, United States, that was listed on the National Register of Historic Places in 1989.  It is a site of wrought-iron crosses and includes work by blacksmith Joseph P. Klein and by blacksmith John Krim.  The NRHP listing included 42 contributing objects.

Joseph P. Klein and John Krim were both of Pierce County.  They were among a number of "German-Russian blacksmiths in central North Dakota" who developed individual styles in their crosses and whose "work was known for miles around them."

References

External links
 
 

Cemeteries on the National Register of Historic Places in North Dakota
German-Russian culture in North Dakota
National Register of Historic Places in Pierce County, North Dakota